Renee Roszel is an American writer who has issues over 40 romance novels since 1983.

Biography
Roszel does not like to study languages or to play music, however, she does like to read. Some of her favorite authors are: Irving Stone, J.D. Salinger, Larry McMurtry and Margaret Mitchell. She also a fan of chocolate and comedy.

She is married to an engineer and has two children. They live in the Midwestern United States.

Bibliography

Single novels
 Hostage Heart (1983)
 Wild Flight (1984)
 Wind Shadow (1984)
 Another Man's Treasure (1985)
 Nobody's Fool (1986)
 Legendary Lover (1989)
 Another Heaven (1989)
 Unwilling Wife (1991)
 Valentine's Knight (1991)
 Devil to Pay (1992)
 Prince of Delights (1992)
 A Bride for Ransom (1993)
 No More Mr. Nice (1993)
 Dare to Kiss a Cowboy (1994)
 Ghost Whispers (1994)
 Sex, Lies and Leprechauns (1994)
 Make-believe Marriage (1995)
 Brides for Brazen Gulch (1996)
 To Lasso a Lady (1996)
 Getting Over Harry (1996)
 There Goes the Bride (1998)
 Boardroom Bridegroom (1998)
 Gift-wrapped baby (1998)
 The One-week Marriage (1999)
 To Catch a Bride (2001)
 Bride on the Loose (2001)
 Her Hired Husband (2001)
 The Tycoon's Temptation (2002)
 Bridegroom on Her Doorstep (2002)
 Surrender to a Playboy (2003)
 A Bride for the Holidays (2003)
 Just Friends To... Just Married (2005)
 Blue Moon Bride (2006)
 Sex, Lies and Cellulite (2007)

The Enchanted Brides Trilogy
 To Marry a Stranger (1997)
 Married by Mistake! (1997)
 Her Mistletoe Husband (1998)

Baby Boom Series
The Billionaire Daddy (1999)

The merits of marriage
 Honeymoon Hitch (2000)
 Coming Home to Wed (2000)
 Accidental Fiancee (2001)

Omnibus In Collaboration
 Cowboy Country (2002) (with Judith Bowen) (The Man from Blue River / To Lasso a Lady)
 Christmas, Kids and Kisses (2006) (with Diana Hamilton and Kate Walker)

References

Notes
 Harlequin Enterprises Ltd's Website

External links
 
 Renee Roszel's Webpage in Fantastic Fiction's Website

Year of birth missing (living people)
Living people
20th-century American novelists
21st-century American novelists
American romantic fiction writers
American women novelists
Women romantic fiction writers
20th-century American women writers
21st-century American women writers